The 1990 season of the astronomy TV show Jack Horkheimer: Star Hustler starring Jack Horkheimer started on January 1, 1990. During this season, the show still had its original name, Jack Horkheimer: Star Hustler. The show's episode numbering scheme changed several times during its run to coincide with major events in the show's history. The official Star Gazer website hosts the complete scripts for each of the shows.


1990 season

References

External links 
  Star Gazer official website
 
 Star Hustler episodes on YouTube
 Star Hustler Scripts - May 1996
 Star Hustler Scripts - June 1996
 Star Hustler Scripts - July 1996
 Star Hustler Scripts - August 1996
 Star Hustler Scripts - September 1996
 Star Hustler Scripts - October 1996
 Star Hustler Scripts - November 1996
 Star Hustler Scripts - December 1996

Jack Horkheimer:Star Hustler
1990 American television seasons